Betsey Trotwood is a fictional character from Charles Dickens' 1850 novel David Copperfield.

Role in novel
Betsey Trotwood is David Copperfield's great-aunt on his father's side, and has an unfavourable view of men and boys, having been ill-used and abandoned by a worthless husband earlier in life. She appears in the novel's first chapter, where she demonstrates her uncommon personality and her dislike of boys when she storms out of the house after hearing that David's mother has had a son, rather than the daughter to whom Trotwood intended to be the godmother.

Betsey plays a bigger role in David's later life by taking him in after he has run away from labelling wine bottles in the factory in Blackfriars where his stepfather, Edward Murdstone, had placed him to work after the death of David's mother. She provides him with a place at a good school in Canterbury and opportunities for a career in Doctors' Commons, thus showing her complex character.

Origin
The character is based on Miss Mary Pearson Strong who lived at Broadstairs, Kent, and who died on 14 January 1855; she is buried in the St. Peter's-in-Thanet churchyard. Her sister Ann married Stephen Nuckell, who was a prominent bookseller in Broadstairs from around 1796 to 1822.  Mary Pearson Strong's former home now hosts Broadstairs' Dickens House Museum.

Legacy
There is a public house in Clerkenwell, Central London, called The Betsey Trotwood. It adopted the name in 1983, having previously been The Butcher's Arms.

The city of Trotwood, Ohio is named after the character.

Film and television portrayals

References

Literary characters introduced in 1850
David Copperfield characters
Fictional housewives
Female characters in film
Female characters in literature